The 28th New Zealand Parliament was a term of the New Zealand Parliament. It was elected at the 1946 general election in November of that year.

1946 general election

The 1946 general election was held on Tuesday, 26 November in the Māori electorates and on Wednesday, 27 November in the general electorates, respectively.  A total of 80 MPs were elected; 49 represented North Island electorates, 27 represented South Island electorates, and the remaining four represented Māori electorates.  1,081,898 voters were enrolled and the official turnout at the election was 93.5%.

Sessions
The 28th Parliament sat for three sessions, and was prorogued on 3 November 1949:

Ministries
Peter Fraser of the Labour Party had been Prime Minister since 27 March 1940. He had formed the first Fraser Ministry on 1 April 1940 and the second Fraser Ministry on 30 April 1940.

Party standings

Members

Initial MPs

By-elections during 28th Parliament
There were a number of changes during the term of the 28th Parliament.

Notes

References

28